Lyryx Learning (Lyryx) is an educational software company offering open educational resources (OERs) paired with online homework & exams for undergraduate introductory courses in Mathematics & Statistics and Business & Economics.

History
In 1997, Claude Laflamme and Keith Nicholson, Professors in the Department of Mathematics and Statistics at the University of Calgary, began work on the design of online tools to support student learning in their classes. Laflamme and Nicholson developed and implemented a formative assessment system which provided immediate, substantive feedback to students based on their work.

In 2000, Laflamme and Nicholson, together with two software developers, Bruce Bauslaugh and Richard Cannings, formed Lyryx Learning Inc., to offer this platform in a number of quantitative disciplines. By 2010, Lyryx supported approximately 100,000 students and 2,000 instructors per year in Canada.

After several years of developing formative online assessment for content from various publishers, including  McGraw-Hill Ryerson in Canada and Flat World Knowledge in the US, Lyryx became a fully independent publisher supporting OERs in 2013, with the launch of Lyryx with Open Texts.

Lyryx with Open Texts

To support the use of OERs in undergraduate introductory courses in Mathematics & Statistics and Business & Economics, Lyryx moved to a social enterprise business model: Funding from the online homework supports both the development and maintenance of OERs as well as contributions to the community. In addition, Lyryx also offers an option of free access to their online homework from an institution's computer labs.

Lyryx with Open Texts includes:

 Adapted Open Texts: Open textbooks which can be distributed at no cost, and editorial services to adapt the open textbooks for each specific course. All textbooks are licensed under a Creative Commons license.
 Formative Online Assessment: Algorithmically generated homework and exam questions are automatically graded, and individualized feedback is also provided to the student.
 Course Supplements: A wide variety of materials to support the instructor including slides, solutions manuals, and test banks. For select products, Lyryx offers source codes in an editable format in LaTeX.
  User Support: In-house support for both instructors and students, 365 days/year.

List of Textbooks

Accounting
 Introduction to Financial Accounting
 Introduction to Financial Accounting: US GAAP
 Intermediate Financial Accounting Volume I
 Intermediate Financial Accounting Volume II
Economics
 Principles of Microeconomics
 Principles of Macroeconomics
 Principles of Economics
Mathematics
 Calculus: Early Transcendentals
 Linear Algebra with Applications
 A First Course in Linear Algebra
Business Mathematics
 Business Math: A Step-by-Step Handbook

Repositories
In addition to lyryx.com, Lyryx Learning open textbooks are also listed in the following repositories:
 Merlot
 OER Commons
 BCcampus
 Manitoba Open Textbook Initiative
 eCampus Ontario Open Textbook Library
 National Network for Equitable Library Service (NNLES)
 Oasis Geneseo Open Textbook Search/State University of New York
 Open Textbook Library/University of Minnesota
 Saylor
 San Diego Community College District OER

OpenStax Ally
Lyryx is an OpenStax Ally for the products listed below. The texts and supplementary resources are provided by OpenStax, and Lyryx provides corresponding online assessment and support.
 Principles of Accounting, Volume 1: Financial Accounting
 Principles of Accounting, Volume 2: Managerial Accounting
 Calculus
 Introductory Statistics
 Introductory Business Statistics

Awards
Lyryx Learning is a 2019 Winner: Outstanding Achievement in Information and Communications Technology for the 30th Annual ASTech Awards.

Lyryx with Open Texts received a "2017 Honorable Mention" from the Open Education Consortium

References

External links
Lyryx Official Website

Educational software companies
Canadian educational websites